Eurema blanda, the three-spot grass yellow, is a small butterfly of the family Pieridae which is found in Sri Lanka, India and southeast Asia.

Description

Life Cycle

Egg 
Pale yellowish oval-shaped eggs are laid under or upper the leaves and hatch after about three days.

Larva 
They are light green in color in first instar and they become bright green color in the last instar.

Pupa 
After 20 days from the hatching , the larva become pupa.

Food plants
Caesalpinia mimosoides and Bauhinia purpurea.

See also
List of butterflies of India
List of butterflies of India (Pieridae)

Notes

References

External links 

"Life cycle of the Three-spot Grass Yellow (Eurema blanda)". Nature Magnified. Retrieved July 6, 2016.

blanda
Butterflies of Asia
Butterflies of Indochina
Butterflies of Singapore
Butterflies described in 1836
Taxa named by Jean Baptiste Boisduval